The 1971–72 Boston University Terriers men's ice hockey team represented Boston University in college ice hockey. In its 10th year under head coach Jack Kelley the team compiled a 26–4–1 record and reached the NCAA tournament for the eighth time. The Terriers defeated Cornell 4–0 in the championship game at the Boston Garden in Boston, Massachusetts to win their second consecutive national championship.

Season

Fast start
Coming on the heels of their first national championship, Boston University opened their season in a brand new home rink, the Walter Brown Arena. The Terriers would no longer have to share their home ice with Northeastern and christened their new home with a win over Yale. BU visited Brown for their next game and shut out the opposition for the first of four times on the season. The Terriers returned home and escaped with a narrow 2–1 win over New Hampshire then welcomed Harvard four days later and the two Boston powerhouses fought to a 4–4 draw. The Terriers rounded out the first part of the schedule with a pair of wins, the first at Princeton and then home against Ohio, the only ever meeting between the two schools.

Holiday Tournaments
With the Boston Arena Christmas Tournament now retired, BU signed on to play in both the ECAC Christmas Tournament and the Syracuse Invitational over their winter break. In the ECAC series Boston University opened against Northeastern and downed the hapless Huskies 4–1 to advance. The Terriers then faced Rensselaer in the final and dominated the competition to get their second shutout on the season and capture the tournament crown.

Just before the first of the year the Terriers headed to Syracuse and took on Minnesota for a rematch of the previous year's national championship. The Gophers put up a much better fight and the two squads fought to a 3–3 tie after 60 minutes. Because this was a tournament game, however, the two teams would continue until someone scored the deciding goal. In the end it was the Terriers who came out victorious and earned the right to face Cornell for the championship. From the start it was apparent that BU was the better team but even with the Terriers outshooting the Big Red 12–5 it was Cornell who scored first. A power play goal mid-way through the second allowed BU to the tie the game followed by a second marker 4 minutes later. BU continued to out chance their opponent but Dan Brady faltered n the third and allowed two goals on only six shots while Dave Elenbaas shut the door on Kelley's boys to take the championship and improve to 7–0 on the season.

The loss to Cornell was only a minor setback for the Terriers but they had already suffered a big loss when after an exhibition game against the US Olympic Team co-starting goalie Tim Regan was lured away to play for the national team. With the Terriers still had the starter from the previous year's championship team in Brady, the duo had split the BU net for the previous two seasons and the Terriers were entering uncharted waters.

Life Without Regan
The Terriers returned to their regular season with an easy game against College Division Merrimack then hit the road to take on Clarkson, and were soundly beaten by the Golden Knights 2–6. BU rebounded the next night against St. Lawrence before returning home to take on cross-town nemesis Boston College. After defeating the Eagles BU welcomed in two College Division opponents and despite receiving a tough game from eventual ECAC 2 champion Massachusetts, the Terriers were in the midst of a win streak.

After wins at Providence and home against Saint Louis Regan returned to the team. In his agreement to play for the national team head coach Murray Williamson would allow Regan to return to BU if Regan was not going to be the starter for the team at the Olympics. When the team decided to stick with Mike Curran and Peter Sears Regan left in the middle of the games to rejoin the Terriers, but with the squad streaking Dan Brady remained in goal.

Beanpot
Boston University opened the 20th Beanpot with a 4–2 win over BC in the semifinal and, after a narrow victory over New Hampshire, the tournament concluded with the Terriers taking down Harvard 4–1 for their seventh title.

After running their win streak to 11 games the third meeting with Boston College ended with a loss and the worst defensive performance all season. The loss was even more damaging for BU since it meant that Cornell, who had lost three conference games since the earlier meeting of the two teams, was now in a virtual tie with the Terriers for the top spot in the ECAC tournament. After winning at home against Providence BU ended their season with a rematch against the Big Red. While Cornell still had one more game to play after the meeting, if the Terriers won the game they would guarantee themselves the ECAC championship.

The Big Red opened the scoring once more and, after BU tied the game, Cornell extended their lead to two with goals early in the second and third period. Brady played much better in the second meeting and allowed Boston University to close the gap with a power play marker mid-way through the third but Elenbaas shut the door the rest of the way and Cornell won the ECAC championship.

ECAC tournament
BU entered the tournament as the second seed and met Rensselaer in the first round. As they had the year before the Terriers easily dispatched the Engineers to advance to the semifinal round at the Boston Garden. Boston University faced Harvard for the third time and finally, after five years of trying, BU was able to return to the ECAC championship game with a 3–1 win. In their way stood only Cornell and this time the Terriers were ready. BU were the ones who started the scoring, getting a goal past Elenbaas less than 90 seconds into the contest and again with under three to play in the first. The BU defense helped Brady by limiting the Big Red to only 5 shots in the opening frame. Cornell was able to cut the lead in half late in the second period but BU reestablished their 2-goal advantage less than two minutes later. The Terriers increased their lead early in the third while Brady shut all further opportunities down and the Terriers won their first ECAC tournament championship.

NCAA tournament
BU was looking to become the first eastern team to defend its national championship but their efforts were dealt a tremendous blow just two days before the championship began when Dan Brady was felled by a knee injury. Regan, who had played only spot duty over the previous six weeks, was the Terriers' only hope of repeating and when they faced Wisconsin in the semifinal things looked bleak early. Regan allowed Wisconsin to score a soft goal early in the game but after the rude welcome the Terriers buckled down and insulated their netminder while he got skating legs under him. Once Regan recovered his form the Terriers were able to go on the offensive and score the next four goals to skate away with the win.

In the final game BU was once again pitted against Cornell but after being one of the few teams that could beat the Big Red in the past five years, BU was not afraid of the Ithaca powerhouse. Cornell got off to a good start and outshot the Terriers in the first but an ill-advised penalty from Gordon McCormick gave BU their first power play of the game and Ron Anderson capitalized. The game remained that way for over 20 minutes before BU potted their second man-advantage marker, this time from Ric Jordan. All of this was happening while Cornell continued to pepper Regan with shots but none could find the back of the net. Another Anderson goal came before the two-minute mark of the third and the game appeared to be slipping away from the Big Red. Jordan's second goal with 7 minutes left gave the Terriers a near-insurmountable lead and though they were playing for pride at this point, the Terriers still could not score a goal and Regan earned the shutout to give BU the national championship.

Tim Regan tied the record for lowest GAA in the tournament (Ken Dryden and Gerry Powers) with a 0.50 mark and was the obvious choice for Tournament MOP. Regan was joined on the All-Tournament Team by Bob Brown, Ric Jordan and John Danby. Brown, Danby and Brady were named to the AHCA All-American East Team and, while Danby and Jordan ended up on the All-ECAC Hockey Second Team, Ric Jordan made the Second Team. Brown and Brady made the first team. Bob Brown, after tying for the team lead in scoring, received the ECAC Hockey Player of the Year, the first Terrier so honored.

Jack Kelley had announced before the final that he was retiring from college hockey and his team did not fail to give him the send-off he deserved. Kelley's squad was the first (and only as of 2019) eastern team to defend it's championship and though his immediate replacement would turn out disastrously for BU, assistant coach Jack Parker would eventually assume the reins and lead the team for 40 years.

Standings

Schedule

|-
!colspan=12 style=";" | Regular Season

|-
!colspan=12 style=";" | 

|-
!colspan=12 style=";" | 

|-
!colspan=12 style=";" | 

|-
!colspan=12 style=";" | 

|-
!colspan=12 style=";" |

Roster and scoring statistics

Goaltending statistics

1972 championship game

(E1) Boston University vs. (E2) Cornell

References

Boston University Terriers men's ice hockey seasons
Boston University
Boston University
Boston University
Boston University
Boston University
Boston University
Boston University
Boston University